Cossyphus is a genus of darkling beetles in the family Tenebrionidae. They occur in Eurasia and Africa.

Species
There are about 33 species and subspecies. Species recorded in Europe include the following:

References

Lagriinae
Tenebrionidae genera
Taxa named by Guillaume-Antoine Olivier